Natchathiram Nagargiradhu is a 2022 Indian Tamil-language romantic musical drama film directed by Pa. Ranjith starring Dushara Vijayan, Kalidas Jayaram and Kalaiyarasan. Tenma replaced Pa. Ranjith's regular, Santhosh Narayanan, as the music composer for the film.

Transgender actress Sherin Celin Mathew, who played Sylvia in the film, died by suicide on 17 May 2022 at Kochi.

Natchathiram Nagargiradhu was released worldwide in theatres on 31 August 2022 and received positive reviews from critics and audience.

Cast 

Kalidas Jayaram as Iniyan
Kalaiyarasan as Arjun
Dushara Vijayan as Rene (Tamizh)
Sindhuja Viji
Shabeer Kallarakkal as Sagas Ratchagan
 Charles Vinoth as Sekar
Manisa Tait as Medellin
Hari Krishnan Anbudurai as Yashvandhiran
Subatra Robert as Karpagam
Vinsu Rachel Sam as Roshini
Lizzie Antony
Regin Rose as Subeer
Gnanaprasad as Ayya Durai
Sumeet Borana as Dayana
Arjun as Praveen
Stephen Raj as Tharu
Uthaiya Surya as Maru
Joel
Sherin Celin Mathew as Sylvia

Release
The film was released theatrically on 31 August 2022.

Home media 
The digital rights of the film has been bagged by Netflix. The film began streaming on Netflix from 28 September 2022.

Reception 
M Suganth of The Times of India rated the film with 3.5/5 stars stating, "Several blending of forms like love, caste, honour killings and music, actually gives the film a vibe that is very new-age, and makes it an experience that shouldn't be missed". Director Anurag Kashyap posted that "the uncensored version of the film is like the director's (Pa.Ranjith) chaotic mind, where so many of his identities are having conversations and conflicting with each other, but want to be in order". Kashyap concluded that it was his favourite film of Pa.Ranjith's, so far.

References

External links 
 

2020s romantic musical films
2020s Tamil-language films
Films directed by Pa. Ranjith
Indian romantic musical films